Matt McClure may refer to:
Matt McClure (broadcaster) (born 1981), American journalist and actor
Matt McClure (footballer) (born 1991), English-born Northern Irish footballer